Claudio Hernán Martínez Gallardo (born 18 July 1980) is a Chilean actor and former professional footballer who played as a goalkeeper for clubs in Indonesia.

Football career
Born in Santiago, Chile, Martínez played mainly as a goalkeeper in Indonesia and used to wear the number 99.

In Indonesia, he played for Persim Maros, Mitra Kukar, Persekaba Badung, PSMS Medan, Persigo Gorontalo, where he scored eight goals, and PPSM Magelang.  

He retired in 2009 and has continued on playing football at exhibition games alongside players such as Cristian Carrasco and Alejandro Tobar. 

In 2016, he had a stint with East Timorese side Assalam FC with his compatriot Simón Elissetche as coach.

Acting career
Following his retirement as a football player, he made his home in Indonesia and switched to showbiz and acting. Using the stage name of Claudio, he became famous after making appearances in the TV series  (Madun's Kick). 

He also has acted in films and took part in advertising for brands such as Mitsubishi and Richesee Nabati.

Personal life
Martínez came to Indonesia in 2001.

His wife is an Indonesian called Musriana, but he prefers called her Ana. They has a daughter called Alexandra.

Controversies
In 2005, he was arrested by taking part in a party with drug use, when he was a player of Mitra Kukar.

In November 2018, Martínez was arrested by drug possession in his home in Depok.

In July 2022, Martínez was assaulted by the employees of a bar located in Kuningan, Jakarta.

References

External links
 Claudio Martínez at Wowkeren.com 
 Claudio Martínez at Sepakbola 
 Claudio Martínez at FilmIndonesia.or.id 
 

1980 births
Living people
Footballers from Santiago
Chilean footballers
Chilean expatriate footballers
Persim Maros players
Mitra Kukar players
PSMS Medan players
Persigo Gorontalo players
PPSM Magelang players
Indonesian Premier Division players
Chilean expatriate sportspeople in Indonesia
Chilean expatriate sportspeople in East Timor
Expatriate footballers in Indonesia
Expatriate footballers in East Timor
Association football goalkeepers
21st-century Chilean male actors
Chilean male film actors